Richard Harper Gomez (born June 1, 1972) is an American actor. He is known for portraying Radio Technician 4th Grade George Luz in the HBO television miniseries Band of Brothers, and as "Endless Mike" Hellstrom in the Nickelodeon TV series The Adventures of Pete and Pete. He is the older brother of actor Joshua Gomez.

Filmography

Film

Television

Video games

References

External links
The New York Times: Movies — Rick Gomez
MSN Movies: Rick Gomez

1972 births
American male film actors
American male television actors
American male video game actors
American male voice actors
Living people
Male actors from New Jersey
Actors from Bayonne, New Jersey
American male actors of Mexican descent
20th-century American male actors
21st-century American male actors
Hispanic and Latino American male actors